Novosergiyevsky (masculine), Novosergiyevskaya (feminine), or Novosergiyevskoye (neuter) may refer to:
Novosergiyevsky District, a district of Orenburg Oblast, Russia
Novosergiyevsky (rural locality), a rural locality (a settlement) in Oryol Oblast, Russia
Novosergiyevskaya, a rural locality (a stanitsa) in Krasnodar Krai, Russia